Schistonchus caprifici is a plant parasitic nematode in the genus Schistonchus parasitizing the caprifig (Ficus carica sylvestris). It is found in Spain and Italy.

Blastophaga psenes is the vector of the nematode bringing it to the fig tree. This species is also transported by the cleptoparasite Philotrypesis caricae (Agaonidae).

References

External links 

 PESI

Aphelenchoididae
Nematodes described in 1927